Nightingale Island is an active volcanic island in the South Atlantic Ocean,  in area, part of the Tristan da Cunha group of islands. They are administered by the United Kingdom as part of the overseas territory of Saint Helena, Ascension and Tristan da Cunha.

Nightingale Island is part of the Nightingale Islands, which also includes islets Middle Island and Stoltenhoff Island. All three are uninhabited, but are regularly visited for scientific purposes and research.

Geography
Nightingale has two peaks on its north end. The rest of the island is ringed by cliffs. However, these cliffs are not nearly as high as those surrounding Nightingale's neighbour Inaccessible Island, which is approximately 16 km away and has cliffs approximately 300m high. Thus human access is much easier on Nightingale than on Inaccessible. The island is a volcano, composed of early and late stage ash deposits. Massive trachytic lava flows have been extruded in the past. Before 2004, the last eruption may have been over 39,000 years ago.

The two nearby islets are called Stoltenhoff and Middle.

Large amounts of kelp surround the island, which makes it difficult to anchor ships in bad weather.

Climate
Nightingale Island has an oceanic climate similar to the other Tristan da Cunha islands.

History
Nightingale was possibly sighted along with Tristan da Cunha in 1506 by Tristão da Cunha, though he made no record of it.

It was originally named "Gebrooken Eyland" (Broken island) by the Dutch ship the Nachtglas under Jan Jacobszoon in January 1656, who found no safe anchorage; the first landing was not made until 1696 (most likely by Willem de Vlamingh in August of that year). French captain Pierre d'Etcheverry also visited the island in September 1767, first recording the two nearby islets now named Stoltenhoff and Middle. The island was later renamed after British captain Gamaliel Nightingale, who explored the island in 1760.

In the 17th and 18th centuries, the Dutch and French governments as well as the British East India Company considered taking possession of Nightingale (as well as Tristan and Inaccessible), but decided against it due to lack of landing space.

Nightingale has been said to contain pirate loot.  Captain John Thomas, on an expedition to the South Atlantic, supposedly left a fortune of Spanish doubloons and pieces-of-eight in caves on Nightingale for safekeeping.  However, no recovery of this treasure (if it is there) has ever been confirmed.

In 1811, the American pirate Jonathan Lambert laid claim to Tristan and its neighbouring islands. He wanted to call Inaccessible 'Pinsard Island', and Nightingale 'Lavel Island'. He was successful in his claim, but he died less than one year later.

They eventually moved to the United Kingdom, returning to Tristan in 1963.

Wildlife conservation efforts are ongoing on Nightingale. The previous conservation workers' sheds were severely damaged during a storm produced by an extratropical cyclone in 2001 that reportedly included winds up to 120 mph. Repair is ongoing, but to continue carrying out the conservation work, all of the damaged shacks on the island need to be repaired. The United Kingdom established funding for a conservation effort on Nightingale for 2004–06.

2004 eruption
A six-hour-long earthquake swarm occurred on Nightingale Island on 29 July 2004, followed by sightings of floating phonolitic pumice; the event came from a submarine flank of the island.

2011 oil spill
Before daybreak on 16 March 2011, the Maltese-registered MS Oliva cargo carrier ran aground at Spinners Point on the island's northwestern shore. The resulting oil spill, which spread around the island, was expected to have a significant impact on the seabird colonies of Nightingale and Middle Island. The ship contained 1,500 metric tons of crude oil and a cargo of 60,000 metric tons of soya beans. As many as 20,000 penguins were threatened, and there was a risk that rats from the ship could make it ashore to eventually prey on the chicks and eggs of native seabirds. Nightingale Island has no fresh water, so the penguins were transported to Tristan da Cunha for cleaning. The Greek captain and his 21 Filipino crew stayed in Edinburgh of the Seven Seas and assisted the islanders in their work.
One of the lifeboats from MS Oliva subsequently washed ashore in February 2013 near the Murray Mouth, South Australia.

Wildlife

Nightingale Island is known as a breeding ground for various types of seabirds; over a million birds are estimated to breed on the island, with great shearwaters being among the most abundant. There are four wetland areas on the island which each contain hundreds of Atlantic yellow-nosed albatrosses. As with Inaccessible Island, Nightingale also has a breeding colony of northern rockhopper penguins, now an endangered species, with a fraction of the 1950s population remaining.  The island is part of the Nightingale Islands group Important Bird Area (IBA), identified as such by BirdLife International as a breeding site for seabirds and endemic landbirds.

Tourism
Inaccessible and Gough Islands are strict nature reserves with no tourism permitted.  However, tourists are permitted to go to Nightingale.

Many tourists to Tristan da Cunha visit Nightingale Island for the wildlife.  Non-Tristanians can travel to Nightingale only with a guide from Tristan. Part of the money they pay the guide goes toward paying for the conservation work being done on the island.  Once a year, filmmakers and journalists are permitted to work on the island (for a fee), but they are not allowed to interfere with the private lives of the Tristanian islanders.  Also, Tristan natives visit Nightingale on holiday.

Economy
Fishing companies fish off the coast of Nightingale, just as they do with Inaccessible.

Nightingale also has guano deposits.

Several silver and cupro-nickel collector coins from Nightingale Island were issued in denominations of one crown in 2005 and 2006. A complete series of coins in values from ½ penny to £2 and including a one crown coin were issued in 2011 by Tristan da Cunha on behalf of Nightingale Island.

Subantarctic fur seal – cupro-nickel – 1 crown denomination
Mahi-mahi – bi-metallic – 25 pence
Oarfish  – brass – 20 pence
Blue shark – cupro-nickel – 10 pence
Octopus – cupro-nickel – 5 pence
Bluefin tuna – copper – 2 pence
Swordfish – copper – 1 penny
Flyingfish – copper – ½ penny

In popular culture
Edgar Allan Poe's The Narrative of Arthur Gordon Pym of Nantucket alluded to Nightingale Island, Inaccessible Island, and Tristan da Cunha.

References

External links

 The Annals of Tristan da Cunha – gives comprehensive history of Tristan da Cunha, Inaccessible, and Nightingale from their initial discovery to 1925 (PDF file)
 Tristan da Cunha News: A conservation project on Nightingale Island
 The Loneliest Place in the World
 Etext of Chapter 15 of Narrative of A. Gordon Pym by Edgar Allan Poe – the chapter that contains the references to Tristan, Inaccessible, and Nightingale
 Tristan da Cunha website – includes information about visiting Nightingale
 Picture of the centre of Nightingale Island
 Nightingale Island Oil Spill – YouTube (1:53)
 

Islands of Tristan da Cunha
Seabird colonies
Uninhabited islands of Saint Helena, Ascension and Tristan da Cunha
Important Bird Areas of Saint Helena